Équipe fédérale Bordeaux-Guyenne were a French football team in existence between 1943 and 1944. They participated in the 1943–44 Coupe de France.

References

Defunct football clubs in France
Association football clubs established in 1943
1943 establishments in France
Association football clubs disestablished in 1944
1944 disestablishments in France
Football clubs in Nouvelle-Aquitaine
Sport in Bordeaux